Proborhyaenidae is an extinct family of metatherian mammals of the order Sparassodonta, which lived in South America from the Eocene (Mustersan) until the Oligocene (Deseadan). Sometimes it has been included as a subfamily of their relatives, the  borhyaenids (as Proborhyaeninae). Proborhyaenid remains have been found in western Bolivia, Uruguay, southern Brazil, and the provinces of Mendoza, Salta, and Chubut, in Argentina.

Most proborhyaenids had a robust, hyena-like skull, although one species, Callistoe vincei, had an elongate, narrow skull more reminiscent of a thylacine. The teeth were strongly specialized as carnassials for eating meat, and in Arminiheringia rotated throughout the animal's life to maintain a continuous shearing blade on the tooth. Preserved specimens of their canines lack enamel; in life, the enamel may have been very thin or restricted to the tooth tips. In the genus Arminiheringia the lower canines are protruding. Proborhyaenids can be distinguished from other sparassodonts by their grooved upper and lower canines, which grew continuously throughout the animals' lives like rodent incisors. Bond and Pascual (1983) argued that proborhyaenid canines stopped growing in late adulthood based on a specimen from Mendoza Province, Argentina, but the proborhyaenid identity of this specimen is disputed. The presence of open-rooted upper canines in thylacosmilids has led to the suggestion that proborhyaenids are closely related to, or even ancestral to, this group, but this is still controversial.

Genera 
 Family Proborhyaenidae
 Genus Arminiheringia  - Argentina
 Genus Callistoe  - Argentina
 Genus Paraborhyaena  - Bolivia
 Genus Proborhyaena  - Argentina, Bolivia and Uruguay

References 

Sparassodonts
Paleogene mammals of South America
Eocene first appearances
Chattian extinctions
Deseadan
Divisaderan
Mustersan
Tinguirirican
Prehistoric mammal families